Robert Laurence Monteith (21 October 1937 – 12 July 1988) was a New Zealand cricket umpire. He stood in six Test matches between 1974 and 1979 and three ODI games between 1975 and 1981.

See also
 List of Test cricket umpires
 List of One Day International cricket umpires

References

1937 births
1988 deaths
Place of birth missing
New Zealand Test cricket umpires
New Zealand One Day International cricket umpires